Gaetano Matteo Monti (13 March 1776 in Ravenna – 27 May 1847 in Milan) was an Italian sculptor, working in the Neoclassical style.

He studied in Bologna and Rome and then moved to Milan, where he worked on Milan Cathedral (Duomo de Milano) and the Arco della Pace with a similarly named Milanese sculptor, Gaetano Monti (1750–1827).

His son was the sculptor Raffaelle Monti.

Works
Tomb of Count Paolo Tosio, Vantiniano Cemetery, Brescia 1842
Bust of Countess Maria Laderchi of Faenza,).
Bust of Ambrogio Calepino  ca. 1839
Monuments to Giuseppe Parini and Giuseppe Zanoja in Pinacoteca di Brera
Tomb of Bishop Gabrio Maria Nava, Duomo of Brescia,
Moses Fountain, at the Sacro Monte in Varese
Tomb of Bishop Gabrio Maria Nava in Duomo of Brescia,

References

18th-century Italian sculptors
Italian male sculptors
19th-century Italian sculptors
People from Ravenna
1776 births
1847 deaths
Neoclassical sculptors
19th-century Italian male artists
18th-century Italian male artists